Solomon Township is a township in Cloud County, Kansas, USA.  As of the 2000 census, its population was 664.

Geography

The streams of Cris Creek, First Creek, Fisher Creek, Lost Creek, Second Creek and Third Creek run through this township.

References
 USGS Geographic Names Information System (GNIS)

External links
 US-Counties.com
 City-Data.com

Townships in Cloud County, Kansas
Townships in Kansas